This is a list of memorials to John F. Kennedy, the 35th president of the United States from 1961 to 1963.

Memorials, busts, and statues

In the United States
John Fitzgerald Kennedy Memorial in Dallas, Texas
The Eternal Flame, JFK's final resting place at Arlington National Cemetery just outside Washington, D.C.
John F. Kennedy Memorial and bust in front of the Holy Cross Church in Holyoke, Massachusetts (dedicated in 1967)
John F. Kennedy Monument and Eternal Flame Memorial, in Forest Park, in Springfield
A bust of President Kennedy was dedicated on May 31, 1965, at Grand Army Plaza in Brooklyn, New York. The bust was removed in 2003 for restoration, and reinstalled in 2010.
Jacques Lipchitz's bust of Kennedy at the Military Park in Newark, New Jersey was dedicated on November 11, 1965.
A life size statue of President John F. Kennedy in the presidential statues across from the Puerto Rico Capitol in San Juan, Puerto Rico.
A bust of President John F. Kennedy by Felix de Weldon at Kennedy Library, Columbia Point, Boston, Massachusetts
John F. Kennedy Memorial located in Hyannis, Massachusetts on Ocean Street was dedicated on July 8, 1966.
A bronze statue of John F. Kennedy by Isabel McIlvain on the grounds of the Massachusetts State House was dedicated on May 29, 1990.
John Fitzgerald Kennedy Memorial in Portland, Oregon
A bust of John F. Kennedy in downtown Nashua, New Hampshire commemorates January 25, 1960 as the first campaign stop in Kennedy's bid for the presidency.
J. F. Kennedy Memorial, Kennedy Plaza, Long Beach, New York.
Kennedy Plaza in front of the Long beach city hall. A rectangular stone wall adorned with a bronze inscription plaque containing a relief of John F. Kennedy in proper left profile encircled by an inscription and a wreath of laurel leaves. The wall is installed in a pool of water.

Outside the United States
John F. Kennedy statue in Colonia John F. Kennedy neighborhood in Tegucigalpa, Honduras
John F. Kennedy Memorial, London, a bust by Jacques Lipchitz unveiled in 1965
John F. Kennedy Memorial stone and plaque, located in the Fitzroy Gardens, Melbourne, Victoria, was dedicated in May 1964 by the then Lord Mayor of Melbourne, His Worship the Right Honourable Edward Leo Curtis.
Yad Kennedy, a memorial to the US president, was established on a crest in the Jerusalem Forest, part of which is designated the John F. Kennedy Peace Forest, on the southwest outskirts of Jerusalem, Israel, near Aminadav.
A Kennedy memorial was established in Runnymede, England, where the Magna Carta was sealed. The memorial is sited on an acre of land gifted to the United States.
A bust of President Kennedy stands outside International Student House on Great Portland St in London. It was unveiled in May 1965 by Senator Robert Kennedy.
A bust of President Kennedy by Hungarian-Canadian Paul Lancz (1919-2005) stands on President Kennedy Avenue (French: Avenue du Président-Kennedy) in Montreal, Quebec. It was dedicated in 1986 and relocated in 2011 to a different site on the same street due to the development of the Quartier des spectacles.
The J. F. Kennedy Memorial, a 1968 mosaic in Birmingham, England
On June 29, 2008, Kennedy's sister, Jean Kennedy Smith, unveiled a statue of her late brother at New Ross, County Wexford, Ireland.
 Kennedy memorial in Quemú Quemú, Argentina built in 1967.

Cities
Kennedy City in Tegucigalpa, Honduras
Ciudad Kennedy in Bogotá, Colombia. The eighth locality of Bogotá, capital of Colombia. It is located in the southwest of the city.
Presidente Kennedy, a municipality in the state of Espírito Santo, Brazil
Presidente Kennedy, a municipality in the state of Tocantins, Brazil

Schools

At Harvard University in Cambridge, Massachusetts:
The Harvard Institute of Politics serves as a living memorial which promotes public service in his name.
The School of Government is known as the John F. Kennedy School of Government.
John F. Kennedy University opened in Pleasant Hill, California, in 1964 as a school for adult education.
Hundreds of schools across the US were named in Kennedy's honor. Several school claim to be the first in the United States named after him, while he was alive, among them John F. Kennedy High School in Cheektowaga, New York, and John F. Kennedy Junior High School in Cupertino, California. In the week after Kennedy's death, the first schools renamed for him were the Kennedy Elementary School in Butte, Montana, and the John F. Kennedy Middle School on Long Island in Bethpage, New York. Both schools held board meetings on November 26, at which time the new names were adopted.
John F. Kennedy High School in Cedar Rapids, Iowa
John F. Kennedy Catholic High School, in Burien, Washington
John F Kennedy Catholic School, in Hemel Hempstead, England
John F. Kennedy Elementary School, Great Neck, New York, United States
John Kennedy College, Mauritius
John F. Kennedy University School of Medicine, a private, offshore medical college in Willemstad.
In 1966, a new secondary school (for students aged 11–18) was founded in Coventry, England. Originally scheduled to be named in honour of former British Prime Minister Winston Churchill, it was instead named President Kennedy School.
Several schools in The Netherlands are named after him, including John F Kennedy-School in The Hague, John F. Kennedy Basisschool in Volendam, Basisschool John F. Kennedy in Oss, Rooms Katholieke Basisschool John F. Kennedyschool in Arnhem, John F Kennedyschool in Hendrik-Ido-Ambacht, John F. Kennedy School in 's-Gravenzande, and Jenaplanschool John F. Kennedy in Zwijndrecht.
John F. Kennedy High School (Montreal), Montreal, Quebec, Canada
John F. Kennedy School, Berlin, Berlin, Germany
John F. Kennedy High School (Los Angeles), Granada Hills, California
John F. Kennedy High School (Fremont, California)
John F. Kennedy Elementary and High School (Tegucigalpa, Honduras)
John F. Kennedy High School (Montgomery County, Maryland)
John F. Kennedy High School (La Palma, California)
John F. Kennedy High School (Guam)
John F. Kennedy Public School (Faridabad, India)
Universidad Argentina John F. Kennedy (Buenos Aires, Argentina)
John F. Kennedy Memorial High School (Woodbridge, New Jersey)
Hong Kong Red Cross John F. Kennedy Centre (Hong Kong)
Jhon F. Kennedy Public High School, (Addis Ababa Ethiopia)

Buildings

The John F. Kennedy Presidential Library and Museum on Columbia Point in Dorchester, Massachusetts opened in 1979 as Kennedy's official presidential library.
The John F. Kennedy Center for the Performing Arts opened in 1971 in Washington, DC
The John F. Kennedy Federal Building in Government Center, Boston.
John F. Kennedy Stadium (Bridgeport), Bridgeport, Connecticut, United States
JFK Stadium (Springfield, Missouri), Springfield, Missouri, United States
One of the five residential towers at the University of Massachusetts Amherst is named "Kennedy Tower" in his honor.
The student union at the University of Dayton is named the John F. Kennedy Memorial Union, which opened in 1964.
A bust of JFK and a building on science campus of the French-language university Université du Québec à Montréal named the pavilion Président-Kennedy are located at President Kennedy Street's western end in Montreal.
In Cumberland, Maryland, a low income residential apartment is named the "John F Kennedy Tower". It was dedicated by Maryland native and late brother-in-law of Kennedy, Sargent Shriver, in 1967.
Philadelphia Municipal Stadium was renamed John F. Kennedy Stadium in 1964. It was razed in 1992 and its former location is now occupied by the Wells Fargo Center.
John F. Kennedy Library, Addis Ababa University, Ethiopia
Kennedy Auditorium, Aligarh Muslim University, India. With a seating capacity of 1375 people, it is the central hall of Aligarh Muslim University.

Transportation facilities
NASA's Launch Operations Center at Cape Canaveral was renamed the John F. Kennedy Space Center. Cape Canaveral itself was likewise renamed Cape Kennedy, but a referendum passed by Florida voters in 1973 reverted it to its original name.
John F. Kennedy International Airport, New York City. The airport is widely referred to as "JFK" which is now its IATA code.
Howard Beach–JFK Airport station on the New York City Subway's  in Howard Beach, Queens, and connecting to the AirTrain JFK to the JFK Airport
Sutphin Boulevard–Archer Avenue–JFK Airport station on the New York City Subway's  in Jamaica, Queens, and connecting to the AirTrain JFK
John F. Kennedy Memorial Airport, Ashland, Wisconsin, United States.
JFK/UMass station, a rapid transit station on the MBTA's Red Line in the Dorchester neighborhood of Boston, Massachusetts.
British Rail Class 25 Diesel Locomotive D7523 is named John F Kennedy and is preserved at the Epping Ongar Railway in Essex, United Kingdom

Roads and bridges

Africa

Burkina Faso
Avenue John F. Kennedy, a street in Ouagadougou

Niger
Kennedy Bridge, a bridge across the Niger River in Niamey

Mauritius
John Kennedy Avenue, a street in Vacoas-Phoenix
John Kennedy Street, a street in Pamplemousses
John Kennedy Street, a street in Port Louis
John Kennedy Street, a street in Roche Terre

Morocco
Avenue John Kennedy (John Kennedy Avenue), a street in Kénitra
Avenue John Kennedy (John Kennedy Avenue), a street in Safi

South Africa
John F Kennedy Street, a street in Hartbeesfontein

Zambia
President Kennedy Street, a street in Kalulushi

Asia

Lebanon
Rue John Kennedy, a street in Beirut, was named in honor of President John F. Kennedy on November 30, 1963.

Iran
Kennedy Street was the name of a street in Tehran, which was renamed Vahdat-e-Islami Street (Islamic Unity Street) after the Revolution of 1979.

Israel
Kennedy Street, Netanya

Europe

Austria
Kennedybrücke (Kennedy Bridge), a bridge in Vienna, finished in 1964 and named after John F. Kennedy, who met Nikita Khrushchev in Vienna in 1961.

Belgium
Avenue John Kennedy (John Kennedy Avenue), a street in Brussels
J. F. Kennedylaan, a street in Sterrebeek
John Kennedylaan, a street in Ghent
Boulevard John Fitzgerald Kennedy, a street in Mons
John Kennedylaan, a street in Ranst
John F. Kennedylaan, a street in Zelzate
John F. Kennedystraat, a street in As
John F. Kennedystraat, a street in Ingelmunster
Kennedylaan, a street in De Haan
Kennedylaan, a street in Grobbendonk
Kennedylaan, a street in Herentals
Kennedylaan, a street in Sint-Truiden
Kennedylaan, a street in Ypres
Kennedytunnel, one of the busiest highway tunnels in Europe, built in the 1960s in Antwerp, and named after President Kennedy
President J.F. Kennedykaai, a wharf in Bruges
President J.F. Kennedylaan, a street in Vilvoorde
President Kennedylaan, a street in Izegem
President Kennedylaan, a street in Kortrijk
President Kennedypark, a business park in Kortrijk
Rue du Président John Fitzgerald Kennedy (President John Fitzgerald Kennedy Street), a street in Aiseau-Presles

Cyprus
John Kennedy Avenue, a street in Nicosia

France
Avenue John Fitzgerald Kennedy (John Fitzgerald Kennedy Avenue), a street in Mérignac
Avenue John-Kennedy (John Kennedy Avenue), formerly Avenue de Paris, a street in Boulogne-sur-Mer
Avenue du Président John Kennedy (President John Kennedy Avenue), a street in Saint-Malo
Avenue du Président John Fitzgerald Kennedy (President John Fitzgerald Kennedy Avenue), a street in Saint-Germain-en-Laye
Avenue du Président-Kennedy (President Kennedy Avenue), a street in Béthune
Avenue du Président-Kennedy (President Kennedy Avenue), a street in Lille
Avenue du Président-Kennedy (President Kennedy Avenue), formerly Quai du Fossé, a street in Mulhouse
Avenue du Président-Kennedy (President Kennedy Avenue), formerly Quai de Passy, a street running alongside the Seine in Paris, in the 16th arrondissement
Avenue du Président-Kennedy (President Kennedy Avenue), a street in Roquebrune-Cap-Martin
Avenue Président John Kennedy (President John Kennedy Avenue), a street in Dijon
Avenue Président-Kennedy (President Kennedy Avenue), a street in Dreux
Avenue Président-Kennedy (President Kennedy Avenue), a street in Narbonne
Avenue Président-Kennedy (President Kennedy Avenue), a street in Neufchâteau
Avenue Président-Kennedy (President Kennedy Avenue), a street in Soissons
Avenue Président-Kennedy (President Kennedy Avenue), a street in Orléans
Boulevard John Fitzgerald Kennedy (John Fitzgerald Kennedy Boulevard), a street in Clermont-Ferrand
Boulevard John Kennedy (John Kennedy Boulevard), a street in Bourg-en-Bresse
Boulevard John Kennedy (John Kennedy Boulevard), a street in Corbeil-Essonnes
Boulevard John Kennedy (John Kennedy Boulevard), a street in Dijon
Boulevard John Kennedy (John Kennedy Boulevard), a street in Draguignan
Boulevard John Kennedy (John Kennedy Boulevard), a street in Vichy
Boulevard du Président-Kennedy (President Kennedy Boulevard), a street in Sens
Boulevard Président-Kennedy (President Kennedy Boulevard), a street in Aix-en-Provence
Boulevard Président-Kennedy (President Kennedy Boulevard), a street in Béziers
Corniche Président John F. Kennedy, formerly Promenade de la Corniche, a street in Marseille, running along the sea front in the 7th and 8th arrondissements
Cours John Kennedy (John Kennedy Walk), a street in Nantes
Promenade J. Fitzgerald Kennedy (J.Fitzgerald Kennedy Promenade), formerly Boulevard de l'Atlantique, a promenade in Les Sables-d'Olonne
Rue J. F. Kennedy (J. F. Kennedy Street), formerly Rue Jeanne d'Arc, a street in Metz
Rue du Président John Fitzgerald Kennedy (President John Fitzgerald Kennedy Street), a street in Roanne
Rue du Président Kennedy (President Kennedy Street), formerly Rue de Cambrai, a street in Saint-Quentin
Rue John Kennedy (John Kennedy Street), a street in Grenoble
Rue John F Kennedy, a street in Paimpol

Germany
John-F.-Kennedy-Brücke (John F. Kennedy Bridge), a bridge over the Isar in Munich, formerly Herzog-Heinrich-Brücke, renamed in 1964
Kennedybrücke (Kennedy Bridge), a bridge over the Rhine in Bonn
Kennedybrücke (Kennedy Bridge), a bridge in Bremerhaven, completed in 1961 and named after Kennedy following his assassination.
Kennedybrücke (Kennedy Bridge), a bridge in Hamburg, between the Binnenalster and Außenalster. Completed in 1953 and originally named Neue Lombardsbrücke, it was renamed Kennedybrücke after the assassination in 1963.
Kennedystraße (Kennedy Street), a street in Amberg
Kennedystraße (Kennedy Street), a street in Cologne, location of the Cologne Bonn Airport
Kennedystraße (Kennedy Street), a street in Bergheim
Kennedystraße (Kennedy Street), a street in Maintal
Kennedystraße (Kennedy Street), a street in Oldenburg
Kennedystraße (Kennedy Street), a street in Puchheim
Kennedyallee (Kennedy Avenue), a street in Frankfurt am Main
John F Kennedy Allee, a street in Pattonville

Ireland
John F Kennedy Avenue, a street in Dublin
John F Kennedy Drive, a street in Dublin
John F Kennedy Road, a street in Dublin
John F. Kennedy Arboretum, a park in Wexford

Italy
Corso John Fitzgerald Kennedy (John Fitzgerald Kennedy Street), a street in Rivoli
Via John Fitzgerald Kennedy (John Fitzgerald Kennedy Street), a street in Caserta
Via John Fitzgerald Kennedy (John Fitzgerald Kennedy Street), a street in Cosenza
Via John Fitzgerald Kennedy (John Fitzgerald Kennedy Street), a street in Ferrara
Via John Fitzgerald Kennedy (John Fitzgerald Kennedy Street), a street in Imola
Via John Fitzgerald Kennedy (John Fitzgerald Kennedy Street), a street in Naples
Via John Fitzgerald Kennedy (John Fitzgerald Kennedy Street), a street in Recale
Via John Fitzgerald Kennedy (John Fitzgerald Kennedy Street), a street in Salerno
Via Presidente Kennedy (President Kennedy Street), a street in Pozzallo
Viale Presidente Kennedy (President Kennedy Avenue), a street in Catania

Luxembourg
Avenue John F. Kennedy (John F. Kennedy Avenue), a street in Luxembourg
Rue J. F. Kennedy (John F. Kennedy Street), a street in Differdange

Macedonia
John F. Kennedy Street, a street in Skopje, Republic of Macedonia

Monaco
Avenue Président J. F. Kennedy (President J. F. Kennedy Avenue), a street in Monaco, near Port Hercule

Netherlands
John F. Kennedylaan (John F. Kennedy Avenue), a street in Apeldoorn
John F. Kennedylaan (John F. Kennedy Avenue), a street in Baarn
John F. Kennedylaan (John F. Kennedy Avenue), a street in Breda
John F. Kennedylaan (John F. Kennedy Avenue), a street in Eindhoven
John F. Kennedylaan (John F. Kennedy Avenue), a street in Heerlen
John F. Kennedylaan (John F. Kennedy Avenue), a street in Rijswijk
John F. Kennedylaan (John F. Kennedy Avenue), a street in Rotterdam
John F. Kennedylaan (John F. Kennedy Avenue), a street in Valkenswaard
John F. Kennedylaan (John F. Kennedy Avenue), a street in Vught
John F. Kennedylaan (John F. Kennedy Avenue), a street in Helden
President Kennedylaan (President Kennedy Avenue), a street in Amsterdam
President Kennedylaan (President Kennedy Avenue), a street in Oegstgeest
President Kennedylaan (President Kennedy Avenue), a street in Roosendaal
Kennedystraat (Kennedy Street), a street in Berlicum
Kennedystraat (Kennedy Street), a street in Drunen
Kennedystraat (Kennedy Street), a street in Geleen
Kennedystraat (Kennedy Street), a street in Hoensbroek
Kennedystraat (Kennedy Street), a street in Liempde
Kennedystraat (Kennedy Street), a street in Ulestraten

Serbia
John Kennedy Street, a street in Zemun/Novi Beograd (runs through both municipalities) in north-west Belgrade, 1.45 km in length.

Spain
Calle del Presidente Kennedy (President Kennedy Street), a street in Villafranca de los Barros
Calle John Kennedy (John Kennedy Street), a street in Los Barrios
Calle Kennedy (Kennedy Street), a street in Benidorm
Calle Presidente Kennedy (President Kennedy Street), a street in Madrid (in the Getafe district)
Carrer del President Kennedy (President Kennedy Street), a street in Banyoles
Carrer del President Kennedy (President Kennedy Street), a street in Figueres

Turkey
Kennedy Avenue, a major highway in Istanbul
John F. Kennedy Street, a street in Ankara

United Kingdom

England
John F Kennedy Court, a street in Wisbech
John F. Kennedy Estate, a street in Washington, near Washington Old Hall
John F Kennedy Gardens, a street in Derby
John Kennedy Court, a street in London
John Kennedy Road, a road in Mottram in Longdendale
Kennedy Drive, a road in Stapleford, Nottinghamshire

Scotland
John Kennedy Drive, a street in Thurso
John Kennedy Place, a street in Kilmarnock
President Kennedy Drive, a street in Stirling

North America

Bahamas
John F. Kennedy Drive, a major roadway in New Providence

Barbados
President Kennedy Drive, a major roadway in Bridgetown linking the Bridgetown Port with the Spring Garden Highway (also location of the Kensington Oval stadium)

Canada
President Kennedy Avenue, a street in Montreal, Quebec. Kennedy was a popular figure in predominantly Roman Catholic Quebec, and was honored with a street in Montreal
Route-du-Président-Kennedy, the official name of Quebec Route 173, a major north–south highway on the south shore of the St. Lawrence River in Quebec, Canada. This road is also known as the old path from Québec city to Boston
Rue John-F.-Kennedy (John F. Kennedy Street), a street in LaSalle, Quebec
Rue John-F.-Kennedy (John F. Kennedy Street), a street in Terrebonne, Quebec built in 1966 a few years after his assassination
Rue John-F.-Kennedy (John F. Kennedy Street), a street in Quebec City
Ecole secondaire John F. Kennedy  (John F. Kennedy High School), a school in Montreal, Quebec

Curaçao

John F. Kennedy Boulevard, a major roadway that runs through the capitol city of Willemstad

Dominican Republic
Avenida John F. Kennedy (John F. Kennedy Avenue), a major roadway in Santo Domingo

Mexico

CDMX (including Mexico State)

Avenida John F. Kennedy (John F. Kennedy Avenue), a street in Mexico city
Calle John F. Kennedy (John F. Kennedy Street), a street in Mexico City
Calle John F. Kennedy (John F. Kennedy Street), a street in Nezahualcóyotl
Calle John F. Kennedy (John F. Kennedy Street), a street in Xonacatlán

Tlaxcala

Privada John F. Kennedy (John F. Kennedy Lane), a street in Tlaxcala

United States

California

John F. Kennedy Drive, a street in Moreno Valley
John F. Kennedy Drive, a street in Riverside
John F. Kennedy Drive and the John F. Kennedy Promenade, a street and a car-free path in San Francisco's Golden Gate Park

Delaware

John F. Kennedy Memorial Highway, a stretch of Interstate 95 in Delaware along the Delaware Turnpike, running from the Maryland border, where the John F. Kennedy Memorial Highway continues south to Baltimore, north to Newport. The road had been dedicated by President Kennedy on November 14, 1963, eight days before his assassination.

Florida

John F. Kennedy Boulevard (State Road 60) in Tampa, renamed for Kennedy in 1964 by unanimous vote of the Tampa City Council. Kennedy visited Tampa on November 18, 1963, four days before his assassination.
John F. Kennedy Causeway, a major causeway in Miami

Illinois

John F. Kennedy Expressway, a major expressway in Chicago, renamed for Kennedy by unanimous vote of Chicago City Council a few days after the president's assassination

Indiana

John F. Kennedy Memorial Bridge, carries Interstate 65 across the Ohio River between Louisville, Kentucky and Jeffersonville, Indiana. The soon-to-be completed span was named in Kennedy's honor four days after his death.

Kentucky

John F. Kennedy Memorial Bridge, carries Interstate 65 across the Ohio River between Louisville, Kentucky and Jeffersonville, Indiana. The soon-to-be completed span was named in Kennedy's honor four days after his death.

Maine

Kennedy Memorial Drive, formerly known as the Oakland Road, runs from the end of Silver Street in Waterville, Maine to the center of town in Oakland, Maine. The roadway was under reconstruction from two lanes to four during the time of Kennedy's assassination. The upgraded roadway was dedicated in his honor.

Maryland

John F. Kennedy Drive, a street in Hagerstown
John F. Kennedy Memorial Highway, a stretch of Interstate 95 in Maryland, running from Baltimore to the Delaware border, where it becomes the Delaware Turnpike, which is also the John F. Kennedy Memorial Highway. The road was formerly called the Northeast Expressway. The road had been dedicated by President Kennedy on November 14, 1963, eight days before his assassination.

Massachusetts

John F. Kennedy Street, formerly Boylston Street, which runs from Harvard Square to the Charles River in Cambridge
John F. Kennedy Memorial Highway, a segment of Massachusetts Route 18 stretching from I-195 to its southern terminus in New Bedford, Massachusetts

Nebraska

Kennedy Freeway, a 20-mile portion of US Route 75 that runs between southern Omaha and Bellevue

New Jersey

John F. Kennedy Beach Drive, a street in North Wildwood
John F. Kennedy Boulevard in Hudson County, New Jersey, a county highway in New Jersey which starts at the Route 440/Bayonne Bridge junction in Bayonne, making its way north to Route 63 in North Bergen.
John F. Kennedy Boulevard, a street in Lawnside
John F. Kennedy Boulevard, a street in Sea Isle City
John F. Kennedy Boulevard, a street in Somerset
John F. Kennedy Boulevard East in Hudson County, New Jersey, a two-way, mostly two lane, scenic thoroughfare in the North Hudson, New Jersey municipalities of Weehawken, West New York, Guttenberg and North Bergen.
John F. Kennedy Drive, a street in Bloomfield
John F. Kennedy Drive, a street in Middlesex
John F. Kennedy Memorial Bridge, a bridge over the Intracoastal Waterway between Egg Harbor Township and Longport
John F. Kennedy Parkway, a street in Millburn and Livingston
John F. Kennedy Way, a street in Willingboro

New York

John F. Kennedy Boulevard, a street in Blauvelt
John F. Kennedy Drive, a street in Stony Point
John F. Kennedy Memorial, a statue in Grand Army Plaza

Pennsylvania

John F. Kennedy Boulevard in Philadelphia, formerly Pennsylvania Boulevard, which runs from 30th Street Station to City Hall at Broad Street.
John F. Kennedy Boulevard Bridge, in Philadelphia, a bridge that carries John F. Kennedy Boulevard over the Schuylkill River 
John F. Kennedy Drive, a street in Upland

Texas

John F. Kennedy Boulevard in Houston, an expressway that connects Beltway 8 (Sam Houston Parkway) to the main terminals of George Bush Intercontinental Airport.
John F. Kennedy Memorial Causeway, formerly The North Padre Island Causeway, connecting Padre Island to the Texas mainland.
John Kennedy Way, a street in El Paso

Puerto Rico
Calle Kennedy (Kennedy Street), a street in Arecibo
Calle Kennedy (Kennedy Street), a street in Dorado
Calle John F. Kennedy (John F. Kennedy Street), a street in Caguas
Calle John F. Kennedy (John F. Kennedy Street), a street in Las Piedras
John F. Kennedy Expressway, a segment of Puerto Rico state road (PR-2) in San Juan.

Oceania

Australia

South Australia

John F Kennedy Memorial Garden, a park in Beulah Park

Victoria

John F Kennedy Memorial, in Treasury Gardens, Melbourne

New Zealand
John F Kennedy Drive, a street in Palmerston North.
John F Kennedy Place, a street in Auckland.

South America

Bolivia
Calle Kennedy (Kennedy Street), a street in Oruro

Brazil

Acre

Travessa Presidente Kennedy (President Kennedy Lane), a street in Feijó

Amazonas

Avenida Presidente Kennedy (President Kennedy Avenue), a street in Manaus
Rua Presidente Kennedy (President Kennedy Street), a street in Manaus

Bahia

Avenida Presidente Kennedy (President Kennedy Avenue), a street in Itabuna
Avenida Presidente Kennedy (President Kennedy Avenue), a street in Prado
Rua Presidente Kennedy (President Kennedy Street), a street in Candeias
Rua Presidente Kennedy (President Kennedy Street), a street in Salvador
Rua Presidente Kennedy (President Kennedy Street), a street in Santo Amaro

Espírito Santo

Avenida Presidente Kennedy (President Kennedy Avenue), a street in Colatina
Avenida Presidente Kennedy (President Kennedy Avenue), a street in Guarapari
Avenida Presidente Kennedy (President Kennedy Avenue), a street in Linhares
Avenida Presidente Kennedy (President Kennedy Avenue), a street in Montanha
Avenida Presidente Kennedy (President Kennedy Avenue), a street in Serra
Rua Presidente John Kennedy (President John Kennedy Street), a street in Vila Velha

Goiás

Avenida Presidente Kennedy (President Kennedy Avenue), a street in Anápolis
Avenida Presidente Kennedy (President Kennedy Avenue), a street in Edéia
Avenida Presidente Kennedy (President Kennedy Avenue), a street in Jaraguá
Avenida Presidente Kennedy (President Kennedy Avenue), a street in Mineiros
Avenida Presidente Kennedy (President Kennedy Avenue), a street in São Francisco de Goiás
Rua Presidente Kennedy (President Kennedy Street), a street in Guapó
Rua Presidente Kennedy (President Kennedy Street), a street in Inhumas
Rua Presidente Kennedy (President Kennedy Street), a street in Iporá
Rua Presidente Kennedy (President Kennedy Street), a street in Jataí
Rua Presidente Kennedy (President Kennedy Street), a street in Rio Verde

Maranhão

Avenida Presidente Kennedy (President Kennedy Avenue), a street in Lago Verde
Avenida Presidente Kennedy (President Kennedy Avenue), a street in Poção de Pedras
Rua Presidente Kennedy (President Kennedy Street), a street in Bacuri
Rua Presidente Kennedy (President Kennedy Street), a street in Bela Vista do Maranhão
Rua Presidente Kennedy (President Kennedy Street), a street in Caxias
Rua Presidente Kennedy (President Kennedy Street), a street in Mirinzal

Mato Grosso do Sul

Rua Presidente Kennedy (President Kennedy Street), a street in Dourados

Minas Gerais

Avenida Presidente Kennedy (President Kennedy Avenue), a street in Janaúba
Avenida Presidente Kennedy (President Kennedy Avenue), a street in Lagoa Santa
Avenida Presidente Kennedy (President Kennedy Avenue), a street in Montes Claros
Avenida Presidente Kennedy (President Kennedy Avenue), a street in Nova Lima
Avenida Presidente Kennedy (President Kennedy Avenue), a street in Uberlândia
Rua Presidente John Kennedy (President John Kennedy Street), a street in Palma
Rua Presidente John Kennedy (President John Kennedy Street), a street in Três Marias
Rua Presidente John Kennedy (President John Kennedy Street), a street in Uberaba
Rua Presidente Kennedy (President Kennedy Street), a street in Brumadinho
Rua Presidente Kennedy (President Kennedy Street), a street in Buritizeiro
Rua Presidente Kennedy (President Kennedy Street), a street in Contagem
Rua Presidente Kennedy (President Kennedy Street), a street in Gonzaga
Rua Presidente Kennedy (President Kennedy Street), a street in Itabirito
Rua Presidente Kennedy (President Kennedy Street), a street in Nova União
Rua Presidente Kennedy (President Kennedy Street), a street in Pedro Leopoldo
Rua Presidente Kennedy (President Kennedy Street), a street in São José da Lapa

Pará

Avenida Presidente Kennedy (President Kennedy Avenue), a street in Parauapebas
Rua Presidente Kennedy (President Kennedy Street), a street in Castanhal
Rua Presidente Kennedy (President Kennedy Street), a street in Santarém

Paraíba

Rua Presidente Kennedy (President Kennedy Street), a street in João Pessoa

Paraná

Avenida Presidente Kennedy (President Kennedy Avenue), a street in Curitiba
Avenida Presidente Kennedy (President Kennedy Avenue), a street in Dois Vizinhos
Avenida Presidente Kennedy (President Kennedy Avenue), a street in Ponta Grossa
Avenida Presidente Kennedy (President Kennedy Avenue), a street in São Sebastião da Amoreira
Rua Presidente John Kennedy (President John Kennedy Street), a street in Jataízinho
Rua Presidente Kennedy (President Kennedy Street), a street in Assis Chateaubriand
Rua Presidente Kennedy (President Kennedy Street), a street in Cambé
Rua Presidente Kennedy (President Kennedy Street), a street in Cascavel
Rua Presidente Kennedy (President Kennedy Street), a street in Douradina
Rua Presidente Kennedy (President Kennedy Street), a street in Matinhos
Rua Presidente Kennedy (President Kennedy Street), a street in Nova Esperança
Rua Presidente Kennedy (President Kennedy Street), a street in Pato Branco
Rua Presidente Kennedy (President Kennedy Street), a street in Porecatu
Rua Presidente Kennedy (President Kennedy Street), a street in Toledo

Pernambuco

Avenida Presidente Kennedy (President Kennedy Avenue), a street in Recife
Rua Presidente Kennedy (President Kennedy Street), a street in Jaboatão dos Guararapes
Rua Presidente Kennedy (President Kennedy Street), a street in Olinda

Piauí

Avenida Presidente Kennedy (President Kennedy Avenue), a street in Teresina
Rua Presidente Kennedy (President Kennedy Street), a street in Miguel Leão

Rio de Janeiro

Avenida Presidente John Kennedy (President John Kennedy Avenue), a street in Miguel Pereira
Avenida Presidente Kennedy (President Kennedy Avenue), a street in Duque de Caxias
Avenida Presidente Kennedy (President Kennedy Avenue), a street in São Gonçalo
Avenida Presidente Kennedy (President Kennedy Avenue), a street in São João de Meriti
Rua John Kennedy (John Kennedy Street), a street in Rio de Janeiro
Rua Presidente Kennedy (President Kennedy Street), a street in Duque de Caxias
Rua Presidente Kennedy (President Kennedy Street), a street in Nova Iguaçú
Rua Presidente Kennedy (President Kennedy Street), a street in Valença
Avenida Presidente Kennedy(President Kennedy Avenue), a street in Barra Mansa

Rio Grande do Norte

Rua Presidente Kennedy (President Kennedy Street), a street in Caicó
Rua Presidente Kennedy (President Kennedy Street), a street in Currais Novos
Rua Presidente Kennedy (President Kennedy Street), a street in Mossoró
Rua Presidente Kennedy (President Kennedy Street), a street in Natal

Rio Grande do Sul

Rua John Kennedy (John Kennedy Street), a street in Flores da Cunha
Rua Presidente Kennedy (President Kennedy Street), a street in Bom Jesus
Rua Presidente Kennedy (President Kennedy Street), a street in Carlos Barbosa
Rua Presidente Kennedy (President Kennedy Street), a street in Frederico Westphalen
Rua Presidente Kennedy (President Kennedy Street), a street in Horizontina
Rua Presidente Kennedy (President Kennedy Street), a street in Paraí
Rua Presidente Kennedy (President Kennedy Street), a street in Sapiranga
Rua Presidente Kennedy (President Kennedy Street), a street in Vacaria

Santa Catarina

Avenida Presidente Kennedy (President Kennedy Avenue), a street in Lages
Avenida Presidente Kennedy (President Kennedy Avenue), a street in São Carlos
Avenida Presidente Kennedy (President Kennedy Avenue), a street in São José
Rua John F Kennedy (John F Kennedy Street), a street in Chapecó
Rua Presidente John Kennedy (President John Kennedy Street), a street in Blumenau
Rua Presidente Kennedy (President Kennedy Street), a street in Criciúma
Rua Presidente Kennedy (President Kennedy Street), a street in Joinville
Rua Presidente Kennedy (President Kennedy Street), a street in Ouro

São Paulo

Avenida Kennedy (Kennedy Avenue), a street in São Bernardo do Campo
Avenida Presidente Kennedy (President Kennedy Avenue), a street in Barueri
Avenida Presidente Kennedy (President Kennedy Avenue), a street in Caieiras
Avenida Presidente Kennedy (President Kennedy Avenue), a street in Diadema
Avenida Presidente Kennedy (President Kennedy Avenue), a street in Osasco
Avenida Presidente Kennedy (President Kennedy Avenue), a street in Piracicaba
Avenida Presidente Kennedy (President Kennedy Avenue), a street in Praia Grande
Avenida Presidente Kennedy (President Kennedy Avenue), a street in Ribeirão Preto
Avenida Presidente Kennedy (President Kennedy Avenue), a street in Rio Claro
Avenida Presidente Kennedy (President Kennedy Avenue), a street in São Caetano do Sul
Avenida Presidente Kennedy (President Kennedy Avenue), a street in Vargem Grande Paulista
Rua John Kennedy (John Kennedy Street), a street in Ferraz de Vasconcelos
Rua John Kennedy (John Kennedy Street), a street in Monte Alto
Rua John Kennedy (John Kennedy Street), a street in Salto
Rua John Kennedy (John Kennedy Street), a street in Vinhedo
Rua John Kennedy (John Kennedy Street), a street in Votuporanga
Avenida Presidente John F Kennedy (President John F Kennedy Avenue), a street in Águas de São Pedro. It was named by the municipal Law no. 227 of 4 February 1964, but the avenue was later renamed by the municipal Law no. 1,358 of 5 December 2006 as Avenida Ângelo Nogueira Vila (Ângelo Nogueira Vila Avenue).
Rua Presidente John F Kennedy (President John F Kennedy Street), a street in Mogi Guaçú
Rua Presidente Kennedy (President Kennedy Street), a street in Bauru
Rua Presidente Kennedy (President Kennedy Street), a street in Descalvado
Rua Presidente Kennedy (President Kennedy Street), a street in Franca
Rua Presidente Kennedy (President Kennedy Street), a street in Guarujá
Rua Presidente Kennedy (President Kennedy Street), a street in Itapira
Rua Presidente Kennedy (President Kennedy Street), a street in Mogi Mirim
Rua Presidente Kennedy (President Kennedy Street), a street in Paranapiacaba, Santo André

Tocantins

Avenida Presidente John Kennedy (President John Kennedy Avenue), a street in Porto Nacional
Avenida Presidente Kennedy (President Kennedy Avenue), a street in Araguaína
Rua Presidente Kennedy (President Kennedy Street), a street in Augustinópolis
Rua Presidente Kennedy (President Kennedy Street), a street in Sampaio

Chile
Avenida Presidente Kennedy (President Kennedy Avenue), a street in Santiago de Chile

Ecuador
Avenida John F. Kennedy, a street in Quito

Peru
Calle John F. Kennedy (John F. Kennedy Street), a street in Trujillo
Parque Kennedy (John F. Kennedy Park), the central park of Miraflores District, Lima

Parks, plazas, and squares

Asia
Kennedy-Guest House This Guest house is present in Siddaganga Institute of Technology, Tumkur, Karnataka, India.
John F. Kennedy Market in Larkana Sindh, Pakistan is named after President Kennedy.

Europe
Kennedy Memorial Park, formerly Eyre Square, Galway, Ireland officially renamed in 1965 in honour of Kennedy, who visited Galway city shortly before his assassination. There is also a bronze bust there to commemorate him.

Belgium
John F. Kennedyplein (John F. Kennedy Square), a square in front of the city hall of Blankenberge
John F. Kennedyplein (John F. Kennedy Square), a square in Bruges, in the Assebroek area
Place John F. Kennedy (John F. Kennedy Square), a square in Charleroi
President Kennedyplein (President Kennedy Square), a roundabout in Ostend at the end of the A10 motorway
J. F. Kennedyplein (J. F. Kennedy Square), a square in Zaventem

Croatia
Trg John F. Kennedy (John F. Kennedy square), a square in Zagreb

Denmark
John F. Kennedys Plads (John F. Kennedy's Square), the square in front of the railway station in Aalborg. Adjacent is a shopping mall and bus terminal called Kennedy Arkaden (The Kennedy Arcade).

France
Place John F. Kennedy (John F. Kennedy Square), a square in Blois
Place John F. Kennedy (John F. Kennedy Square), a square in Perpignan
Place du Président Kennedy (President Kennedy Square), a square in Angers
Place du Président Kennedy (President Kennedy Square), a square in Cherbourg
Place du Président Kennedy (President Kennedy Square), a square in Issy-les-Moulineaux
Place du Président Kennedy (President Kennedy Square), a square in Plérin
Place du Président Kennedy (President Kennedy Square), a square in Vanves

Germany
John-F.-Kennedy-Platz (John F. Kennedy Square), a square located in Berlin-Schöneberg, formerly Rudolph-Wilde-Platz, the location where Kennedy gave his "Ich bin ein Berliner" speech on June 26, 1963. Renamed 3 days after Kennedy's assassination.

Italy
Piazza John Fitzgerald Kennedy (John Fitzgerald Kennedy Square), a square in Castelfiorentino
Piazza John Fitzgerald Kennedy (John Fitzgerald Kennedy Square), a square in La Spezia
Piazza John Fitzgerald Kennedy (John Fitzgerald Kennedy Square), a square in Marotta
Piazza John Fitzgerald Kennedy (John Fitzgerald Kennedy Square), a square in Ravenna
Piazza John Fitzgerald Kennedy (John Fitzgerald Kennedy Square), a square in Rome, near the Palazzo della Civiltà Italiana
Piazza Kennedy (Kennedy Square), a square in Bellusco
Piazza Kennedy (Kennedy Square), a square in Celico
Piazza Kennedy (Kennedy Square), a square in Cirò Marina
Piazza Kennedy (Kennedy Square), a square in Forino
Piazza Kennedy (Kennedy Square), a square in Jesolo
Piazza Kennedy (Kennedy Square), a square in Lamezia Terme
Piazza Kennedy (Kennedy Square), a square in Loreto
Piazza Kennedy (Kennedy Square), a square in Qualiano
Piazza JF Kennedy (John F Kennedy Square), a square in Vico Equense

Netherlands
John F. Kennedyplein (John F. Kennedy Square), a square in Purmerend
President Kennedyplein (President Kennedy Square), a square in Beverwijk
President Kennedyplein (President Kennedy Square), a square in Leidschendam
President Kennedyplein (President Kennedy Square), a square in Kaatsheuvel
President Kennedyplein (President Kennedy Square), a square in Maastricht

Spain
 Plaça John F. Kennedy (John F. Kennedy Square), a square in Barcelona
Plaza de John F. Kennedy (John F. Kennedy Square), a square in Málaga

North America

John F. Kennedy Memorial Park in Cambridge, Massachusetts, a public park located next to the John F. Kennedy School of Government at Harvard University. The landscaped green space near Harvard Square has a fountain inscribed with JFK quotations, plus open fields and pathways.
John F. Kennedy Park in Atlanta, Georgia
John F. Kennedy Plaza in Philadelphia, Pennsylvania, nicknamed Love Park
Kennedy Plaza in Providence, Rhode Island (formerly exchange plaza) located between the Providence City Hall and US Federal Court House
JFK Memorial Park in Fall River, Massachusetts (public)
John F Kennedy Park in San José, Costa Rica, a public park in the central area of the city.

South America

Brazil
Praça John Fitzgerald Kennedy (John Fitzgerald Kennedy Square) in São Bernardo do Campo, São Paulo
Praça Presidente Kennedy (President Kennedy Square), a square in São Paulo

Peru
John F Kennedy Park, a park in Arequipa

Songs
"Abraham, Martin and John", 1968, written by Dick Holler and recorded first by Dion; the title refers to assassination victims Abraham Lincoln, Martin Luther King Jr. and John F. Kennedy. In the song, the lyrics mention Robert F. Kennedy ("Bobby"), as well.
"Elegy for J.F.K." by Igor Stravinsky (1964)
"He Was a Friend of Mine", recorded by The Byrds, was included on their 1965 album, Turn! Turn! Turn!. In The Byrds' version, the song's melody is altered and the lyrics are changed to lament John Kennedy's assassination.
Jazz composer and arranger Oliver Nelson recorded a tribute album entitled The Kennedy Dream which used excerpts from Kennedy's speeches in 1967.
"Crucifixion", Phil Ochs wrote the song in 1965 and released it on his 1967 album Pleasures of the Harbor
"In the Summer of His Years", 1963, lyrics by Herb Kretzmer and music by David Lee, first sung by Millicent Martin

Other

The United States Postal Service honored Kennedy with two postage stamps, a 5¢ issued in 1964, and a Prominent Americans series (1965–1978) 13¢.
The US Navy aircraft carrier USS John F. Kennedy (CV-67) was named on April 30, 1964, and served until March 23, 2007. A second USS John F. Kennedy was commissioned in 2019.
The John Fitzgerald Kennedy National Historic Site is a National Historic Site that includes Kennedy's birthplace and childhood home in Brookline, Massachusetts and is open to the public.
The John F. Kennedy Hyannis Museum is a museum located in Hyannis, Massachusetts. It consists of a collection of photographs relating to the Kennedys and the times they spent vacationing on the Hyannis Port. It includes a video on the Kennedys, a Kennedy Family Tree, and a statue, "What Could Have Been", portraying John F. Kennedy walking on the beach with his adult son, John F. Kennedy Jr.
The main house of the historic Kennedy Compound in which the Kennedy family would spend their summers and which was Senator John F. Kennedy's home during his senator years (1953-1956) and as well as his main base during his successful 1960 presidential campaign, a place for meetings and interviews and a presidential retreat and summer White House until his assassination, was donated in 2012 to the Edward M. Kennedy Institute for the United States Senate in accordance with the promise Ted Kennedy made to Rose that the house be preserved and used for charity. The institute announced that the house would host educational seminars and that will be open to the general public at specific times as a museum, dedicated to the Kennedy family. As of 2014, the house is undergoing a complete restoration in order to appear exactly as it was in 1960.
The Kennedy Homestead, birthplace of President John F. Kennedy's great-grandfather Patrick Kennedy, is a cultural museum in Ireland that is dedicated to the Kennedy family and plays an important role in the continued preservation of the legacy of the Kennedys in Ireland.
The Hyannis Armory which was the site of Kennedy's presidential acceptance speech is now owned by the town of Barnstable, Massachusetts and is open to the public.
Kennedy was posthumously awarded the Presidential Medal of Freedom in 1963.
Since 1964, Kennedy's portrait has appeared on the half-dollar coin, replacing Benjamin Franklin.
John F. Kennedy Medical Center is a hospital located in Edison, New Jersey.
Mount Kennedy is a peak in the Saint Elias Mountains in Yukon, Canada; named after the President following his assassination
One of the Solomon Islands is named Kennedy Island
The city of Evansville, Indiana observed John F. Kennedy Day on November 22, 2003, to mark the 40th anniversary of his death.
In February 2007, Kennedy's name, along with his wife's, was included on a list taken aboard the Japanese Kaguya spacecraft to the Moon, as part of The Planetary Society's "Wish Upon the Moon" campaign. In addition, they are included on the list onboard NASA's Lunar Reconnaissance Orbiter mission.
The US Army's John F. Kennedy Special Warfare Center and School is named after the president because of his support for the Army Rangers and Special Forces.
John F. Kennedy Park in the Auckland suburb of Castor Bay in New Zealand
The exterior of 14 Prince's Gate, formerly the Royal College of General Practitioners, in London, bears a plaque noting that Kennedy lived there as a boy when his father was US Ambassador to the United Kingdom from 1938 to 1940.
The Historic Auto Attractions Museum, in Roscoe, Illinois, houses a large display dedicated to the president. Items on display include the 1956 Secret Service Cadillac which followed the car in which the President, Mrs. Kennedy, and Governor and Mrs. Connally were riding when Kennedy was assassinated; a replica of the 1963 Lincoln Continental used by the Kennedy; and several other items related to the Kennedy family, Lee Harvey Oswald, and Jack Ruby.
A low-cost housing complex in the Jardín Balbuena neighborhood of Mexico City was dedicated to President Kennedy and named after him in 1964. Senator Robert Kennedy and Mexican President Adolfo López Mateos inaugurated it on November 17.

See also
Cultural depictions of John F. Kennedy
 Assassination of John F. Kennedy in popular culture
 Cultural depictions of Jacqueline Kennedy Onassis
 Presidential memorials in the United States

References

External links
Every John F. Kennedy Street, Park, Airport, and School in the World at Slate

John F. Kennedy-related lists
Kennedy, John F.
Kennedy, John F.
List